Treager's Black Jokes was a collection of more than 40 anti-black racist cartoons, published in London by bookseller Gabriel Shear Tregear in the 1830s. The cartoons could be purchased individually or in bound albums in Tregear's shop. Tregear published two series, Life in Philadelphia (1833) and Tregear's Black Jokes (1834), plus additional cartoons.

Life in Philadelphia (Tregear) 
Tregear's first series was published in 1833 under the name "Life in Philadelphia." This was the same name that had been used by American illustrator Edward Williams Clay for his 1828-1830 cartoon series, published in the United States. "The cartoons were so popular that the term 'Life in Philadelphia' became a standard phrase to refer to fashions, trends, and—most especially—black Philadelphians' social practices and sartorial choices." In 1831, British illustrator William Summers redrew and enlarged ten of Clay's cartoons, which were engraved by Charles Hunt, and issued as color lithographs by London publisher Harrison Isaacs.

Of the twelve cartoons in Tregear's initial series, Summers designed and drew nine, two were reissues of Clay cartoons redrawn by Summers (from Isaacs), and Charles Hunt engraved all eleven as lithographs. The last cartoon was credited as "Drawn & Engraved by I. Harris." "I. Harris" is now accepted as a pseudonym for Edward Williams Clay himself. Another eight of the Clay cartoons redrawn by Summers (from Isaacs) were soon reissued to expand the first Tregear series to twenty plates.

While the successful transfer of Clay's cartoons was attributable in part to the shared cultural backgrounds and common understandings of London and Philadelphia, the London cartoons took on a new meaning and form. London artists like Isaacs, Summers, Hunt, and Tregear made changes that signposted shifts in the cartoons' meanings, exaggerated the features of Philadelphian blacks even more grotesquely than had Clay, rendering them more bestial in anatomy and features.

Additions 
In 1831, William Summers and Charles Hunt copied ten cartoons from Edward Williams Clay's Life in Philadelphia series for publisher Harrison Isaacs. Tregear's version of Life in Philadelphia initially reprinted two of the cartoons from Isaacs, but soon added eight more, bringing its number of plates to twenty.

At least two alternate cartoons, copied from Clay, were reissued by Tregear under the name "Life in Philadelphia."

Tregear's Black Jokes 
Tregear's second series was titled Tregear's Black Jokes, being a Series of Laughable Caricatures in the March of Manners amongst the Blacks. It consisted of twenty new cartoons drawn by Summers and engraved by Hunt, and was published in 1834. 

The second series was reissued in 1860 by London publisher T. C. Lewis.

References

Anti-black racism in the United Kingdom
Stereotypes of African Americans